Grange Castle, is in Grange West, County Kildare, Ireland. It is an Irish National Monument.

References

Castles in County Kildare
Archaeological sites in County Kildare
National Monuments in County Kildare